Silyl-modified polymers (SMP; also silane-modified polymers, modified-silane polymers, MS polymers, silane-terminated polymers, etc.) are polymers terminating with a silyl group. SMPs are the main components in solvent-free and isocyanate-free sealant and adhesive products. Typically the sealant products manufactured with silyl-modified polymers have good adhesion on a wide range of substrate materials, and have good temperature and UV resistance.

MS polymers consist of a polyether backbone with dimethoxy-silyl or trimethoxy-silyl ends, with trimethoxy-silyl groups being more reactive. Backbones can be linear with single or double ends, or branched for an increased amount of cross linking. Precursors can also be varied in the molecular weight and  reactive silyl group concentration, resulting in variable cure times, strength, density, and hardness.

Curing process
The products cure from a liquid or gel state to a solid.  Curing entails crosslinking by the hydrolysis of silyl ethers:
 2 RSi(OCH3)2R' + H2O → [RSi(OCH3)R']2O + 2 CH3OH

In a hydrolysis reaction, a catalyst and moisture is required to form an intermediate silanol, which then reacts to form siloxane linkages in a condensation process.

References

Adhesives